Atsugewi is a recently extinct Palaihnihan language of northeastern California spoken by the Atsugewi people of Hat Creek and Dixie Valley. In 1962, there were four fluent speakers out of an ethnic group of 200, all elderly; the last of these died in 1988. The last fluent native speaker was Medie Webster; as of 1988, other tribal members knew some expressions in the language. For a summary of the documentation of Atsugewi see Golla (2011: 98-99).

Atsugewi is related to Achumawi. They have long been considered as part of the hypothetical Hokan stock, and it has been supposed that within that stock they comprise the Palaihnihan family.

The name properly is Atsugé, to which the -wi of the Achumawi or Pit River language was erroneously suffixed.

History

Estimates for the pre-contact populations of most native groups in California have varied substantially. Alfred L. Kroeber estimated the combined 1770 population of the Achumawi and Atsugewi as 3,000. A more detailed analysis by Fred B. Kniffen arrived at the same figure. T. R. Garth (1978:237) estimated the Atsugewi population at a maximum of 850.

Kroeber estimated the combined population of the Achumawi and Atsugewi in 1910 as 1,100. The population was given as about 500 in 1936.

Sounds

Consonants

Atsugewi has 32 consonants. Most of these form pairs of plain and glottalized. Plosives and affricates also have a third, aspirated member of the series (except for the single glottal stop).

Vowels

Atsugewi language has basically only three vowels: /a/, /o/, and /i/; /e/ is the allophone of /i/ while /o/ is the allophone of /u/. However, it has been supported by Leonard Talmy (1972) that there are instances such as the word ce "the eye(s)" where e can be analyzed as a proper phoneme.

References

Bibliography

 Bright, William. (1965). [Review of A history of Palaihnihan phonology by D. L. Olmsted]. Language, 41 (1), 175-178.
 Golla, Victor. California Indian Languages. Berkeley: University of California Press, 2011. .
 Good, Jeff. (2004). A sketch of Atsugewi phonology. Boston, MA. (Paper presented at the annual meeting of the Society for the Study of the Indigenous Languages of the Americas, January 8–11).
 Good, Jeff; McFarland, Teresa; & Paster, Mary. (2003). Reconstructing Achumawi and Atsugewi: Proto-Palaihnihan revisited. Atlanta, GA. (Paper presented at the annual meeting of the Society for the Study of the Indigenous Languages of the Americas, January 2–5).
 Mithun, Marianne. (1999). The languages of Native North America. Cambridge: Cambridge University Press.  (hbk); .
 Olmsted, David L. (1954). Achumawi-Atsugewi non-reciprocal intelligibility. International Journal of American Linguistics, 20, 181-184.
 Olmsted, David L. (1956). Palaihnihan and Shasta I: Labial stops. Language, 32 (1), 73-77.
 Olmsted, David L. (1957). Palaihnihan and Shasta II: Apical stops. Language, 33 (2), 136-138.
 Olmsted, David L. (1958). International Journal of American Linguistics, 24, 215-220.
 Olmsted, David L. (1959). Palaihnihan and Shasta III: Dorsal stops. Language, 35 (4), 637-644.
 Olmsted, David L. (1961). Atsugewi morphology I: Verb Inflection. International Journal of American Linguistics, 27, 91-113.
 Olmsted, David L. (1964). A history of Palaihnihan phonology. University of California publications in linguistics (Vol. 35). Berkeley: University of California Press.
 Talmy, Leonard. (n.d.). Midway phonological analysis of Atsugewi. (Unpublished notes).
 Talmy, Leonard. (1972). Semantic structures in English and Atsugewi. (Doctoral dissertation, University of California, Berkeley).

External links 
 Atsugewi Language (Atsuge, Atsugeyi, Apwaruge)
 Atsugewi language overview at the Survey of California and Other Indian Languages
 Atsugewi, World Atlas of Language Structures Online
 Atsugewi, California Language Archive
 OLAC resources in and about the Atsugewi language

Pit River tribes
Palaihnihan languages
Languages of the United States
Extinct languages of North America
Native American history of California